Tirumala is a genus of brush-footed butterflies erected by Frederic Moore in 1880. Its species are distributed in Africa, Asia, and Australia.

Species

References

External links

 
Taxa named by Frederic Moore
Butterfly genera